is a Japanese manga series written and illustrated by Yushin Kuroki, serialized in Shueisha's shōnen manga magazine Weekly Shōnen Jump from September 2018 to May 2019, with its chapters collected in four tankōbon volumes.

Publication
Teenage Renaissance! David, written and illustrated by Yushin Kuroki, was serialized in Shueisha's shōnen manga magazine Weekly Shōnen Jump from September 15, 2018, to May 27, 2019. Shueisha collected its chapters in four tankōbon volumes, released from January 4 to July 4, 2019.

Viz Media published the series' first three chapters for its "Jump Start" initiative. Shueisha simultaneously published the manga in English on its Manga Plus online platform.

Volume list

References

External links
 

Comedy anime and manga
Cultural depictions of David
Shōnen manga
Shueisha manga
Viz Media manga